Fábio Mello (born June 28, 1975) is a Brazilian mixed martial artist who fought on Pride Fighting Championships, DEEP, Shooto, Bellator Fighting Championships, Jungle Fight and Titan Fighting Championships. He is currently the no gi and brazilian jiu-jitsu trainer of Imperial Athletics.

Mixed martial arts career

Japanese and Brazilian promotions
Mello started his career in 2001. Between 2001 and 2008, he fought only for Japanese and Brazilian promotions like Pride Fighting Championships, DEEP, Jungle Fight and Meca World Vale Tudo. He compiled a record of four wins and six losses, facing opponents like Takanori Gomi, José Aldo and Fredson Paixão.

Bellator Fighting Championships
Mello faced Sami Aziz on June 19, 2009 at Bellator 12. He defeated Aziz via submission due to an armbar in the third round.

On November 19, 2011 at Bellator 58, Mello faced  Farkhad Sharipov. He won via unanimous decision after three rounds (30-27, 30-27, 30-27).

Titan Fighting Championships
Mello faced Josh Huber on March 2, 2012 at Titan Fighting Championships 21. He defeated Huber via submission in the first round.

Mello was expected to face Nick Mamalis on May 25, 2012 at Titan Fighting Championships 22. But for undisclosed reasons, Mamalis was replaced by Angelo Duarte. Once again Mello won via submission in the first round.

World Series of Fighting
Mello was expected to face Waylon Lowe on November 3, 2012 at WSOF 1. However, the fight was scrapped due to Mello getting injured.

Mello made his debut against Nick LoBosco on October 26, 2013 at WSOF 6. He lost via knockout in the first round.

Mixed martial arts record

|-
| Loss
| align=center| 11–8
| J.J. Ambrose
| TKO (punches)
| Gladiators Fighting Championship 9
| 
| align=center| 2
| align=center| 3:48
| Mishref, Kuwait
|
|-
| Loss
| align=center| 11–7
| Nick LoBosco
| KO (head kick and punches)
| WSOF 6
| 
| align=center| 1
| align=center| 2:02
| Coral Gables, Florida, United States
| 
|-
| Win
| align=center| 11–6
| Angelo Duarte
| Submission (arm-triangle choke)
| Titan Fighting Championships 22
| 
| align=center| 1
| align=center| 4:34
| Kansas City, Kansas, United States
| Featherweight bout.
|-
| Win
| align=center| 10–6
| Josh Huber
| Submission (arm-triangle choke)
| Titan Fighting Championships 21
| 
| align=center| 1
| align=center| 3:26
| Kansas City, Kansas, United States
| 
|-
| Win
| align=center| 9–6
| Farkhad Sharipov
| Decision (unanimous)
| Bellator 58
| 
| align=center| 3
| align=center| 5:00
| Hollywood, Florida, United States
| Moves down to bantamweight.
|-
| Win
| align=center| 8–6
| Charles Bennett
| Decision (split)
| World Extreme Fighting 45
| 
| align=center| 3
| align=center| 5:00
| Jacksonville, Florida, United States
| 
|-
| Win
| align=center| 7–6
| George Castaneda
| Submission (arm-triangle choke)
| Maximo Fighting Championship
| 
| align=center| 1
| align=center| 2:24
| San Juan, Puerto Rico
| 
|-
| Win
| align=center| 6–6
| Sami Aziz
| Submission (armbar)
| Bellator 12
| 
| align=center| 3
| align=center| 1:58
| Hollywood, Florida, United States
| 
|-
| Win
| align=center| 5–6
| Anthony Morrison
| Submission (guillotine choke)
| AOF 1: Rumble at Robarts
| 
| align=center| 1
| align=center| 2:17
| Sarasota, Florida, United States
| 
|-
| Loss
| align=center| 4–6
| Jorge Clay
| Decision (unanimous)
| Hero's The Jungle 2
| 
| align=center| 3
| align=center| 5:00
| Manaus, Amazonas, Brazil
| 
|-
| Loss
| align=center| 4–5
| José Aldo
| Decision (unanimous)
| Top Fighting Championships 3
| 
| align=center| 3
| align=center| 5:00
| Rio de Janeiro, Brazil
| 
|-
| Loss
| align=center| 4–4
| Masakazu Imanari
| Decision (unanimous)
| Deep: 21st Impact
| 
| align=center| 3
| align=center| 5:00
| Tokyo, Japan
| 
|-
| Win
| align=center| 4–3
| Vinicius Magalhães
| TKO (punches)
| Storm Samurai 8
| 
| align=center| 2
| align=center| N/A
| Brasília, Brazil
| 
|-
| Loss
| align=center| 3–3
| Fredson Paixão
| Decision (unanimous)
| Jungle Fight 3
| 
| align=center| 3
| align=center| 5:00
| Manaus, Amazonas, Brazil
| 
|-
| Loss
| align=center| 3–2
| Takanori Gomi
| TKO (punches)
| Pride Bushido 4
| 
| align=center| 1
| align=center| 8:07
| Nagoya, Aichi, Japan
| 
|-
| Win
| align=center| 3–1
| Luciano Azevedo
| Decision (unanimous)
| Shooto Brazil: Welcome to Hell
| 
| align=center| 2
| align=center| 5:00
| Niterói, Rio de Janeiro, Brazil
| 
|-
| Loss
| align=center| 2–1
| Dokonjonosuke Mishima
| Decision (unanimous)
| Deep: 8th Impact
| 
| align=center| 3
| align=center| 5:00
| Tokyo, Japan
| 
|-
| Win
| align=center| 2–0
| Takumi Yano
| Decision (unanimous)
| Deep: 6th Impact
| 
| align=center| 3
| align=center| 5:00
| Tokyo, Japan
| 
|-
| Win
| align=center| 1–0
| Aritano Silva Barbosa
| TKO (punches)
| Meca World Vale Tudo 5
| 
| align=center| 1
| align=center| 8:27
| Curitiba, Paraná, Brazil
|

References

1975 births
Living people
Brazilian male mixed martial artists
Mixed martial artists utilizing Brazilian jiu-jitsu
Brazilian practitioners of Brazilian jiu-jitsu
People awarded a black belt in Brazilian jiu-jitsu
People from Coconut Creek, Florida